The 2016 Cheltenham Borough Council election was held on 5 May 2016 to elect members of Cheltenham Borough Council in England. This was on the same day as other local elections. The result was a victory for the incumbent Liberal Democrat administration, which increased its overall majority.

Overall Results

Ward results

All Saints

Battledown

Benhall & The Reddings

Charlton Kings

Charlton Park

College

Hesters Way

Lansdown

Leckhampton

Oakley

Park

Pittville
Dennis Parsons was expelled from the Liberal Democrats on 17 June 2020 for using a racist slur at a council meeting the day before. He now sits as an Independent.

Prestbury

Springbank

St Mark’s

St Paul’s

St Peter’s

Swindon Village

Up Hatherley

Warden Hill

References

2016 English local elections
2016
2010s in Gloucestershire